Axel Sundermann (born 23 January 1968) is a German former professional footballer.

Since 2013, he was appointed manager of SC Weitmar 45.

Honours
Hannover 96
 DFB-Pokal: 1991–92

References

1968 births
Living people
German footballers
Association football defenders
Bundesliga players
Hannover 96 players
SC Freiburg players
VfL Bochum players
SC Verl players
People from Lemgo
Sportspeople from Detmold (region)
Footballers from North Rhine-Westphalia
West German footballers